Tanybria aurichalcea is a species of leaf beetle of Gabon and the Democratic Republic of the Congo, described by James Thomson in 1858.

References

Eumolpinae
Beetles of Africa
Insects of Gabon
Beetles of the Democratic Republic of the Congo
Beetles described in 1858